Events from the year 1397 in Ireland.

Incumbent
Lord: Richard II

Events
 The Great Book of Lecan was started at Enniscrone. (Completed in 1418).
 Robert Braybrooke, Bishop of London appointed Lord Chancellor of Ireland.
 John Deping appointed Bishop of Waterford and Lismore

References